Zhu Xiangzhong (28 October 1932 – 24 August 2022) was a Chinese diplomat who served as Chinese Ambassador to Peru from 1988 to 1990 and Chinese Ambassador to Chile from 1990 to 1995.

Biography
Zhu was born in Lianshui County, Jiangsu, on 28 October 1932. He attended Xiangzhuang Primary School and Huaihai No. 1 High School. He joined the Chinese Communist Party (CCP) in December 1945. In 1950, he was accepted to Jiangsu Normal University (now Suzhou University), majoring in Chinese language and literature. After graduating in 1953, he was sent to study at Moscow State Institute of International Relations on government scholarships. 

Zhu joined the Foreign Service in 1960 and has served primarily in the US-Australia Department and Europe-America Department of the Ministry of Foreign Affairs. In 1969, he was assigned to the Department of West European Affairs, and worked there until 1980, when he was despatched to the Chinese Embassy in Cuba. In 1985, he became deputy director of the Department of Affairs of the Americas and Oceania, and held that office until 1988. In June 1988, he succeeded  as the Chinese Ambassador to Peru, serving in that position from 1988 to 1990. He retired in March 1996.

On 24 August 2022, he died of myocardial infarction, at the age of 89.

Work

Award
  Order of the Sun of Peru (October 1990)

References

1932 births
2022 deaths
People from Lianshui County
Soochow University (Suzhou) alumni
Moscow State Institute of International Relations alumni
Ambassadors of China to Peru
Ambassadors of China to Chile
Grand Crosses of the Order of the Sun of Peru